Timothy R. Bonner (born June 7, 1950) is an American attorney and politician, currently serving as a member of the Pennsylvania House of Representatives from the 8th district.

Early life and education 
Bonner earned a Bachelor of Arts degree in Political Science from Westminster College, followed by a Juris Doctor from Notre Dame Law School.

Career 
Prior to entering politics, Bonner worked as an attorney in Mercer County, Pennsylvania. Bonner served as Mercer County Assistant District Attorney from 1993 to 2010. He also worked as an instructor at Grove City College.

Bonner assumed office after a special election March 12, 2020, succeeding Tedd Nesbit, who resigned from the House after being elected to the Court of common pleas. Bonner will serve for the rest of Nesbit's term, and has announced his intention to run for re-election in November 2020. He is a member of the Republican Party.

Committee assignments 

 Children & Youth
 Health, Subcommittee on Health Facilities, Chair
 Human Services
 Judiciary

References 

Republican Party members of the Pennsylvania House of Representatives
Westminster College (Pennsylvania) alumni
Notre Dame Law School alumni
Living people
21st-century American politicians
1950 births